The 2013–14 ABA season was the thirteenth season of the American Basketball Association. The season began in late 2013 and ended in March 2014.

The ABA announced that the quarterfinals, semifinals and championship games would be aired on ESPN 3.

Standings

These are the final standings

Playoffs

References

American Basketball Association (2000–present) seasons
ABA